Wyomissing Area Junior/Senior High School is a secondary school serving the Wyomissing Area School District. Located in the borough of Wyomissing, Pennsylvania, United States, the school has approximately 950 students  in grades seven through twelve. WAHS has been included in Newsweeks list of top 1,200 public high schools in the United States annually since 2006. 

In 2014, The Washington Post named WAHS the most challenging public school in the state, excluding magnet and charter schools, and U.S. News & World Report ranked it as the best public school in the state, excluding magnet and charter schools.

History
In 1909, the Wyomissing school district was founded, with classes being taught in a private residence. In 1908, the district's first building was completed on Belmont Avenue and served grades 1-11 until 1922 (seniors attended another area high school). It served grades 1-6 until 1939. This building is now the Wyomissing Institute of Fine Arts. The first dedicated high school building was constructed in 1923 on Wyomissing Boulevard. This building remained the high school until 1939, when it became the elementary school and the high school moved to Evans Avenue. The current high school was constructed in 1940, as part of Franklin Roosevelt's depression recovery program, the Works Projects Administration.  The building was expanded to meet the growing student body in 1965, and was renovated in 1994.  The Wyomissing School District became the Wyomissing Area School District upon merging with the former West Reading School District in the late 1960s.  In 1984, the original high school, which was built in 1923, was destroyed and the land was sold for housing.

An addition was finished in September 2006. This added several classrooms, a chorus room, and a stagecraft workshop.  The somewhat controversial renovation removed two courtyards in the school, many windows in classrooms, and part of the student parking area. The school's auditorium was also renovated. This included removing the windows, replacing the seats, installing new curtains and carpeting, repainting, and installing garage doors in the stage right wing and the new set construction rooms so that scenery could be moved.

Academics
There are 567 sections of 183 courses in basic core areas and in a wide variety of electives. The school offers 30 honors and 16 Advanced Placement courses.  During the 2003-04 school year, 221 AP exams were administered to 104 students, and the average score (1-5) was a 4.1.  The same year, the average SAT score was 1133 (571 in math and 562 in verbal); the state average was 1002 (502 in math and 500 in verbal). The school boasts a 95% graduation rate, with 94% of high school seniors attending a two- or four-year institution of higher education.

Extracurricular activities
The school offers a number of opportunities for student participation outside of the classroom.

Athletics
Since the early 1990s, the school has won state championships in boys' football (2012), boys' soccer (1994), girls' cross country (1999, 2000, 2001, 2002), boys’ cross country (2017), girls' tennis (2000, 2001, 2002, 2003, 2016), boys' track (2003), boys' volleyball (2008), boys' tennis (2009, 2010, 2012), and golf (2012).

The school fields the following teams:

Baseball
Basketball
Bowling
Cheerleading
Color guard
Cross country
Field hockey
Football
Golf
Lacrosse
Marching band
Boys' soccer
Girls' soccer
Softball
Swimming
Tennis
Spring track and field
Winter track and field
Volleyball
Wrestling

Clubs
The school offers the following extracurricular clubs:

Art Club
Big Spartan/Little Spartan
Brass Ensemble 
Camerata
Chariot student newspaper
Chess Club
Chorale
Colophon yearbook
Color Guard
Concert Choir
Cooking Club
Debate Team
Drama Club
Environmental Club
French Club
Freshmen Select Ensemble
Jazz Band
Latin Club
Literary-Art Magazine
Marching Band
Math Team
Model UN
Peer Mediation 
Pit Orchestra
Service Club
Spanish Club
Student Council
Student Tutoring
TechnoSpartans
Varsity Singers
Wyo5Live
 Wyo Quiz Bowl Team
 Steam Club

Notable alumni

 Alex Anzalone, professional football player, Detroit Lions
 Douglas Carter Beane, playwright  
 Megan Gallagher, Broadway actress
 Jon Gosselin, reality television personality
 Matt Lytle, former professional football player, Carolina Panthers and Seattle Seahawks
 Taylor Swift, Grammy Award-winning singer and songwriter (attended but did not graduate)
 Katrina Szish, television host and features contributor for CBS' The Early Show
 Ross Tucker, former professional football player, journalist, broadcaster, and radio host
 Dave Weiner, guitarist for Grammy Award-winning Steve Vai

References

External links
 Wyomissing Area Junior/Senior High School homepage
 Wyomissing Area School District webpage

1908 establishments in Pennsylvania
Educational institutions established in 1908
Public high schools in Pennsylvania
Public middle schools in Pennsylvania
School buildings completed in 1940
Schools in Berks County, Pennsylvania